Delaney is an Irish surname.  It can also be used as a given name.

Notable people with the given name include

 Delaney Bramlett (1939–2008), American singer-songwriter, musician, and producer
 Delaney Collins (born 1977), Canadian women's ice hockey player
 Delaney Davidson (born 1972),  New Zealand singer-songwriter
 Delaney Gibson,  American singer-songwriter 
 Delaney Jane, (born 1993), Canadian pop vocalist
 Delaney Miller (born 1995), American professional rock climber
 Delaney Rudd (born 1962), retired American professional basketball player 
 Delaney Williams (born 1962), American actor

English unisex given names